National road or National route may refer to:

Classes of road 

 Argentina, see List of highways in Argentina
 Australia, see Highways in Australia § National Routes and Highways
 Belgium, see List of National Roads in Belgium
 Democratic Republic of the Congo, see Transport in the Democratic Republic of the Congo § Highways
 Route nationale, a trunk road in France
 Ghana, see Ghana Road Network § National routes
 Greece, see Highways in Greece § National roads
 Iceland, List of roads in Iceland
 Indonesia, see Transport in Indonesia § National routes
 Ireland, 
 National primary road, a road classification in Ireland
 National secondary road, a category of road in Ireland
 Japan, see National highways of Japan
 Morocco, see Transport in Morocco § Roads
 Paraguay, see Transport in Paraguay § Roads
 National roads in Poland
 Portugal, see Roads in Portugal
 Senegal, see Transport in Senegal § National roads
 National routes (South Africa)
 National highways of South Korea
 Spain, see List of national roads in Spain
 Swedish national road
 National Road, in the United States
 Vietnam, see Transport in Vietnam § Highways

Specific roads

Serbia
 National Road (M)1 (Serbia)
 National Road (M)1.9 (Serbia)
 National Road (M)1.10 (Serbia)
 National Road (M)1.11 (Serbia)

United States
 National Road or Cumberland Road, a historic road in the United States
 National Road (Cambridge, Ohio) or Peacock Road, a historic road in the United States

Other uses 
 National road (South Africa) (SANRAL)
 National Roads Authority, in Ireland
 National Roads Company of Israel

See also
 N road (disambiguation)
 National Highway (disambiguation)
 State road